Nanorana unculuanus (common names: Yunnan Asian frog) is a species of frog in the family Dicroglossidae.
It is endemic to central and southern Yunnan, China, although it is expected to have wider distribution than currently known, possibly extending into Vietnam.
Its natural habitats are fast-flowing hill streams and riparian habitats in forests and grasslands, but also man-made habitats like roadside drainage ditches and ponds. It is a rare and secretive species that appears to be declining. It is currently threatened by collection for food and also by habitat loss.

References

unculuanus
Amphibians of China
Endemic fauna of Yunnan
Amphibians described in 1960
Taxonomy articles created by Polbot